Oligacanthorhynchida is an order containing a single parasitic worm family, Oligacanthorhynchidae, that attach themselves to the intestinal wall of terrestrial vertebrates.

Taxonomy and description

Species
Oligacanthorhynchida contains twelve genera and numerous species.

Cucullanorhynchus

The genus Cucullanorhynchus Amin, Ha and Heckmann, 2008 is named for the anterior hood. It was described in 2008 based on samples collected from the intestines of mammals between 1998 and 2004 in Vietnam.

Cucullanorhynchus constrictruncatus Amin, Ha and Heckmann, 2008
C. constrictruncatus is the only species in the genus Cucullanorhynchus. It has been found in the intestine of the leopard (Panthera pardus) in Vietnam. The trunk has an anterior hood in both sexes and a posterior constriction in females. The species name derives from this constriction near the posterior end of females.

Heptamegacanthus

The genus Heptamegacanthus Spencer-Jones, 1990 contains 1 species.

Heptamegacanthus niekerki Spencer-Jones, 1990

H. niekerki is a parasite of the giant golden mole (Chrysospalax trevelyani) found in South-East Africa.

Macracanthorhynchus

The genus Macracanthorhynchus Travassos, 1917 contains many species.

Macracanthorhynchus catulinus Kostylev, 1927
Macracanthorhynchus erinacei Dollfus, 1953
Macracanthorhynchus hirudinaceus (Pallas, 1781)
M. hirudinaceus is a parasite which lives in the intestines of pigs and other suids, and very occasionally in humans or dogs. It causes enteritis, gastritis or peritonitis. Its life cycle includes beetles of the genus Melolontha as intermediate hosts. This species has many synonyms which include: Echinorhynchus gigas (Block, 1782), Macracanthorhynchus gigas (Block, 1782), Echinorhynchus hirundinacea (Palas, 1781), Gigantorhynchus hirundinaceus (Pallas, 1781), Gigantorhynchus gigas (Block, 1782), Hormorhynchus gigas (Block, 1782), Taenia haeruca (Pallas, 1776), and Taenia hirundinaceus (Pallas, 1781) The complete mitochondrial genome of M. hirudinaceus has been sequenced. The eggs have 4 membranes are 98 um long and have an elongation ratio of 1.85.

Macracanthorhynchus ingens (Linstow, 1879)

The eggs have 3 membranes are 94 um long and have an elongation ratio of 1.66. It parasitizes the raccoon (Procyon lotor) in the United States.

Multisentis

The genus Multisentis Smales, 1997 contains 1 species.

 Multisentis myrmecobius Smales, 1997

Neoncicola

The genus Neoncicola Schmidt, 1972 contains several species.

Neoncicola artibei Smales, 2007

N. artibei was found infesting the great fruit-eating bat (Artibeus lituratus) in Paraguay.

Neoncicola avicola (Travossos, 1917)
Neoncicola bursata (Meyer, 1931)
Neoncicola curvata (Linstow, 1897)
Neoncicola novellae (Parona, 1890)
Neoncicola pintoi (Machado, 1950)
Neoncicola potosi (Machado, 1950)
Neoncicola sinensis Schmidt and Dunn, 1974
Neoncicola skrjabini (Morosow, 1951)

Nephridiacanthus

The genus Nephridiacanthus  Meyer, 1931 contains several species.

Nephridiacanthus gerberi  Baer, 1959
Nephridiacanthus kamerunensis  Meyer, 1931
Nephridiacanthus longissimus  Golvan, 1962
Nephridiacanthus major (Bremser, 1811)

N. major has been found infesting the long-eared hedgehog (Hemiechinus auritus) and the southern white-breasted hedgehog (Erinaceus concolor) in Iran, Germany, Morocco, central Asia, Egypt, Bulgaria, Tajikistan, Lebanon, Sicily, Italy, Nigeria, Turkey and Mongolia. Phylogenetic analysis has been done on the small subunit ribosomal DNA and cytochrome c genes, and have determined that it belongs to the family Oligacanthorhynchidae.

Nephridiacanthus manisensis  Meyer, 1931
Nephridiacanthus maroccanus  Dollfus, 1951
Nephridiacanthus palawanensis (Tubangui and Masiluñgan, 1938)
Nephridiacanthus thapari (Sen and Chauhan, 1972)

Oligacanthorhynchus

The genus Oligacanthorhynchus Travassos, 1915 contains numerous species. The trunk is cylindrical and smooth or irregularly ringed. The proboscis is generally globular being somewhat longer than it is wide and has stout hooks in left handed spiral rows, with their point obliquely cut and their root produced forwards. The proboscis receptacle consists of a thick inner wall i inserted into inside of proboscis which is shrinks along the ventral side, and a thinner outer wall inserted at base of neck. A series of intercommunicating spaces branching from two median main vessels and numerous longitudinal and circular anastomoses in the hypodermis form the lacunar system. Protonephridia are present. The lemnisci are filiform with a central canal and numerous nuclei. In the far posterior of the male, there are testes and eight cement glands used to temporarily close the posterior end of the female after copulation. The eggs are almost spherical with shells that are radially striated. Hosts include birds with snakes being the intermediate hosts.

Oligacanthorhynchus aenigma (Reichensperger, 1922)
Oligacanthorhynchus atratus (Meyer, 1931)
Oligacanthorhynchus bangalorensis (Pujatti, 1951)
Oligacanthorhynchus carinii (Travassos, 1917)

O. carinii was found infesting the southern three-banded armadillo (Tolypeutes matacus) in Paraguay.

Oligacanthorhynchus cati (Gupta and Lata, 1967)
Oligacanthorhynchus circumplexus (Molin, 1858)
Oligacanthorhynchus citilli (Rudolphi, 1806)
Oligacanthorhynchus compressus (Rudolphi, 1802)
Oligacanthorhynchus decrescens (Meyer, 1931)
Oligacanthorhynchus erinacei (Rudolphi, 1793)
Oligacanthorhynchus hamatus (von Linstow, 1897)
Oligacanthorhynchus iheringi Travassos, 1917
Oligacanthorhynchus indicus Rengaraju and Das, 1981
Oligacanthorhynchus kamerunensis (Meyer, 1931)
Oligacanthorhynchus kamtschaticus Hokhlova, 1966
Oligacanthorhynchus lagenaeformis (Westrumb, 1821)
Oligacanthorhynchus lamasi (Freitas and Costa, 1964)
Oligacanthorhynchus lerouxi (Bisseru, 1956)
Oligacanthorhynchus major (Machado-Filho, 1963)
Oligacanthorhynchus manifestus (Leidy, 1851)
Oligacanthorhynchus mariemily (Tadros, 1969)
Oligacanthorhynchus microcephala (Rudolphi, 1819)
Oligacanthorhynchus minor Machado-Filho, 1964
Oligacanthorhynchus oligacanthus (Rudolphi, 1819)
Oligacanthorhynchus oti Machado-Filho, 1964
Oligacanthorhynchus pardalis (Westrumb, 1821)

The eggs are 58 um long and have an elongation ratio of 1.45.

Oligacanthorhynchus ricinoides (Rudolphi, 1808)

O. ricinoides was found inside the body cavity of 0.68% of the African five-lined skink (Trachylepis quinquetaeniata reported as Mabuya quinquetaeniata) sampled in the Qena Governorate, Egypt. The worm is cylindrical and white. The wall of the body consists of a thin cuticle over a syncytical hypodermis. The proboscis is cylindrical and contains recurved sclerotized hooks. The trunk measures 1.9–3.1 mm long by 0.56–0.77 mm wide in the female and 1.9–2.99 mm. in length and 0.58–0.98 mm in width in the much smaller male. A series of intercommunicating spaces branching from two median main vessels and numerous longitudinal and circular anastomoses in the hypodermis form the lacunar system. The proboscis receptacle is inserted in the inner side of proboscis. The lemnisci are filiform with a central canal and numerous nuclei. The testes are located in the mid-region of the body and each measure 0.14–0.15 mm long by 0.10–0.11 mm wide.

Oligacanthorhynchus shillongensis (Sen and Chauhan, 1972)
Oligacanthorhynchus spira (Diesing, 1851)
Oligacanthorhynchus taenioides (Diesing, 1851)
Oligacanthorhynchus thumbi Haffner, 1939
Oligacanthorhynchus tortuosa (Leidy, 1850)
Oligacanthorhynchus tumidus (Van Cleve, 1947)

Oncicola
The genus Oncicola Travassos, 1916 contains many species.

Oncicola campanulata (Diesing, 1851)
Oncicola canis (Kaupp, 1909)

O. canis was found infesting the Red fox (Vulpes vulpes) in Iran.

Oncicola chibigouzouensis Machado-Filho, 1963
Oncicola confusa (Machado-Filho, 1950)
Oncicola dimorpha Meyer, 1931
Oncicola freitasi (Machado-Filho, 1950)
Oncicola gigas Meyer, 1931
Oncicola justatesticularis (Machado-Filho, 1950)
Oncicola luehei (Travassos, 1917)

The complete mitochondrial genome of O. luehei has been sequenced.

Oncicola machadoi Schmidt, 1917
Oncicola macrurae Meyer, 1931
Oncicola magalhaesi Machado-Filho, 1962
Oncicola malayanus Toumanoff, 1947
Oncicola martini Schmidt, 1977
Oncicola michaelseni Meyer, 1932
Oncicola micracantha Machado-Filho, 1949
Oncicola oncicola (von Ihering, 1892)
Oncicola paracampanulata' Machado-Filho, 1963
Oncicola pomatostomi (Johnston and Cleland, 1912)
Oncicola schacheri Schmidt, 1972

O. schacheri is named after the collector of the samples Dr. John F. Schacher. It was found in the small intestines of around 20% of foxes (Vulpes vulpes, palestina subspecies) and juveniles were also found in the mesentaries of a badger (Meles meles) and are considered incidental hosts. All samples were collected in Lebanon. There is no marked sexual dimorphism apart from a small size difference: males were between 30.0 and 39.0 mm long and females were 39.0 to 44.0 mm long. There are twelve regularly alternative longitudinal rows of 3 hooks each. The hooks vary in size between 95 and 210 microns.

Oncicola signoides (Meyer, 1932)
Oncicola spirula (Olferas, 1819)
South American species that is common in captive primates.
Oncicola travassosi Witenberg, 1938
Oncicola venezuelensis Marteau, 1977
This species was described by a sample infecting the intestine of the ocelot (Leopardus pardalis) in Venezuela, where it gets its name. It differs from other species of the genus mainly by its longer lemnisci which have six nuclei. There is no sexual dimorphism, with males ranging in length from 13.5 to 14.4 mm (without proboscis) and 2 mm maximum width and females ranging in length from 15 to 16 mm (also without proboscis) with a maximum width of 1.9 to 2.2 mm.

Cystacanths of O. venezuelensis are present in the hemocoel of Caribbean termites (Nasutitermes acajutlae) from St. Thomas and St. John islands in the U.S. Virgin Islands as an intermediate host. Cystacanths were present in Other intermediate hosts including in subcutaneous nodules of lizards (Anolis cristatellus and Anolis stratulus), in the greater omentum of small Indian mongooses (Urva auropunctata), and embedded in mesenteries of pearly-eyed thrashers (Margarops fuscatus). The host from the U.S Virgin Islands is yet to be determined.

Pachysentis

The genus Pachysentis Meyer, 1931 contains ten species. Generally, they look identical to Oncicola apart from the number of hooks on the proboscis. Species of Oncicola have 36 or less hooks whereas species of Pachysentis have more. Specifically, the proboscis is not quite spherical and contains 42 to 102 hooks arranged into 12 longitudinal rows 3 to 12 hooks each. The rows may be regularly or irregularly alternating and straight or crooked. Hooks have tips with or without barbs, and the larger hooks with complex manubria and roots with the remaining spines being rootless. The trunk is fairly wide relative to the length with the anterior half usually wider than the posterior half. The testes are in tandem with at least one located before the middle of the worm. There are eight cement glands compactly arranged each with single giant nucleus used to temporarily close the posterior end of the female after copulation. The eggs have a sculptured outer membrane. Hosts include Brazilian or Egyptian carnivores. Species can be distinguished based on the number and arrangements of proboscis hooks, whether these hooks are barbed, the arrangement of the cement glands, host, and the length of lemnisci.

Pachysentis angolensis (Golvan, 1957)
Pachysentis canicola Meyer, 1931
Pachysentis dollfusi (Machado-Filho, 1950)
Pachysentis ehrenbergi Meyer, 1931
Pachysentis gethi (Machado-Filho, 1950)
Pachysentis lenti (Machado-Filho, 1950)
Pachysentis procumbens Meyer, 1931
Pachysentis procyonis (Machado-Filho, 1950)
Pachysentis rugosus (Machado-Filho, 1950)
Pachysentis septemserialis (Machado-Filho, 1950)

Paraprosthenorchis

Paraprosthenorchis Amin, Ha and Heckmann, 2008 have a trunk over 200 mm long, ornate proboscis with three non-barbed hooks in each of 16 rows. They have simple hook roots without manubria, and a large oblong horizontally posterior hook base. There are about 35 festoons. Protonephridia are gill-like and capsular. Gonopore is terminal. The primary host are Manidae in Vietnam with ants and termites as intermediate hosts. This genus is named for its nearest oligacanthorhynchid genus, Prosthenorchis.

Paraprosthenorchis ornatus Amin, Ha and Heckmann, 2008

P. ornatus has been found in the intestine of the Chinese pangolin (Manis pentadactyla) collected from the Hanoi Zoological Park, Vietnam. The anterior trunk has many small festoons and proboscis hooks are inserted in elevated papillae separated by beady, near hexagonal, ornate grids. The species is named for its uniquely ornate proboscis.

Prosthenorchis

Prosthenorchis Travassos, 1915 have a trunk up to 50 mm long, a proboscis that is not ornate with three barbed hooks in each of 12 rows. They have complex hook roots with large manubria, and a small discoid posterior hook base. There are up to 23 festoons. Gonopore is subterminal. The primary host are primates in South America and Felidae in Africa with cockroaches and beetles as intermediate hosts.
Prosthenorchis elegans (Diesing, 1851)
Prosthenorchis fraterna (Baer, 1959)
Prosthenorchis lemuri Machado-Filho, 1950
Prosthenorchis sinicus Hu-Jiand, 1990

Tchadorhynchus
The genus Tchadorhynchus Troncy, 1970 was erected as the single species contained within differs from related Oligacanthorhynchidae genera by morphological features of bot the adult and embryo as well as the group of hosts, hyenas, the worms parasitize.

Tchadorhynchus quentini Troncy, 1970

T. quentini was found parasitizing the striped hyena (Hyaena hyaena) and the spotted hyena (Crocuta crocuta)in Chad.

Hosts
Oligacanthorhynchidae species parasitize mammals with insect and lizard intermediate hosts.

Notes

References

Acanthocephala families
Archiacanthocephala